The 2016–17 Duke Blue Devils women's basketball team represented Duke University during the 2016–17 NCAA Division I women's basketball season. Returning as head coach was Joanne P. McCallie entering her 10th season. The team plays its home games at Cameron Indoor Stadium in Durham, North Carolina as members of the Atlantic Coast Conference. They finished the season 28–6, 13–3 in ACC play to finish in a tie for second place. They advanced to the championship game of the ACC women's tournament where they lost to Notre Dame. They received an at-large bid to the NCAA women's tournament where they defeated Hampton in the first round before getting upset by Oregon in the second round.

2016–17 media
All Blue Devils games will air on the Blue Devil IMG Sports Network. WDNC will once again act as the main station for the Blue Devils IMG Sports Network games with Steve Barnes providing the play-by-play and Morgan Patrick acting as analyst.

Roster

Rankings
2016–17 NCAA Division I women's basketball rankings

Schedule

|-
!colspan=12 style="background:#001A57; color:#FFFFFF;"| Exhibition

|-
!colspan=12 style="background:#001A57; color:#FFFFFF;"| Non-conference regular season

|-
!colspan=12 style="background:#001A57; color:#FFFFFF;"| ACC Regular Season

|-
!colspan=12 style="background:#001A57;"| ACC Women's Tournament

|-
!colspan=12 style="background:#001A57;"| NCAA Women's Tournament

Source

See also
 2016–17 Duke Blue Devils men's basketball team

References

Duke Blue Devils women's basketball seasons
Duke
Duke